Ženski košarkaški klub Stara Pazova is a Serbian women's basketball team from Stara Pazova, Serbia. The club currently plays in Women's Serbian League.

History

Arena

Current roster

Notable former players
Bobana Filipović
Ivana Dević
Milica Špikić
Ivana Grbić
Iva Musulin
Dragana Vuković
Milica Inđić
Ivana Terzić
Mirjana Beronja

Notable former coaches 
 Jovan Gorec
Miroslav Kanjevac
Slađan Ivić
Željko Babić

External links
 Profile on eurobasket.com
 Profile at srbijasport.net

Stara Pazova